Shamdarra or Shamdharra is a village and union council (an administrative subdivision) of the Mansehra District in the Khyber Pakhtunkhwa province of Pakistan. It is located in the north of the district where it borders the Batagram District.

Economy 
About 58% of the population of the Shamdharra area are engaged in bucolic occupations, such as agriculture/cultivation, animal husbandry, livestock management and forestry. The rest of the population work as expatriates in other locations in Pakistan, or abroad. Others are engaged in local small and medium-scale businesses.

People and language 

The main languages of the region are Hindko (77%), Pushto (18%) followed by Gojri (5%) and others. The main ethnic groups are: Pathans (Swati, Tanoli, Khan khel, Bala khail, Tor khail  Hassanzai, Akazai, aka Khel), Awan, Gujar and Sayyids. It is most diverse town in the area, which accepts almost all the people from different customs and backgrounds.

References 

Union councils of Mansehra District
Populated places in Mansehra District